Mike Coan is an American politician from the state of Georgia. He is a former member of the Georgia House of Representatives.

Coan graduated from South Gwinnett High School. He was elected to the Georgia House in 1996, after defeating incumbent Vinson Wall, and resigned in 2010 after Governor Sonny Perdue named him the administrator of the Subsequent Injury Trust Fund. In 2022, Coan ran for the Republican nomination for Georgia Labor Commissioner. He lost the primary election to Bruce Thompson.

References

External links

|-

|-

Living people
People from Gwinnett County, Georgia
Republican Party members of the Georgia House of Representatives
Year of birth missing (living people)